Chris Brent (born 3 December 1965) is a South African cricketer. He played in one first-class match for Border in 1995/96.

See also
 List of Border representative cricketers

References

External links
 

1965 births
Living people
South African cricketers
Border cricketers
Cricketers from East London, Eastern Cape